The Canary Islands Network for Protected Natural Areas (Red Canaria de Espacios Naturales Protegidos) is a conservation organization in the Canary Islands.

It recognizes 146 areas across the islands of Tenerife, Gran Canaria, La Palma and Fuerteventura as under protection. Of the 146 protected sites under control of network in the Canary Islands archipelago, a total of 43 are located in Tenerife, the most protected island in the group.

Criteria
The network has criteria, which places areas under its observation under eight different categories of protection. These include:

 National park
 Natural park
 National monument
 Protected area
 Integral nature reserve
 Special natural reserve
 Rural park
 Site of scientific Interest

References

See also
 Tourism in the Canary Islands
 Marine life of the Canary Islands
 Geography of the Canary Islands

Nature conservation in Spain